Chitradurga district is an administrative district of Karnataka state in southern India. The city of Chitradurga is the district headquarters. Chitradurga gets its name from Chitrakaldurga, an umbrella-shaped lofty hill found there. Tradition dates Chitradurga District to the period of the Ramayana and Mahabharata. The whole district lies in the valley of the Vedavati River, with the Tungabhadra River flowing in the northwest. During the British times it was named Chitaldroog. The district was practically ruled by all the well known dynasties that ruled Karnataka. A historical places like Jain basadi of Heggere,a pilgrimage centre for Jain's in district.

Demographics
According to the 2011 census Chitradurga district has a population of 1,659,456, roughly equal to the nation of Guinea-Bissau or the US state of Idaho. This gives it a ranking of 297th in India (out of a total of 640).
Its population growth rate over the decade 2001–2011 was 9.39%. Chitradurga has a sex ratio of 969 females for every 1000 males, and a literacy rate of 73.82%. Scheduled Castes and Scheduled Tribes make up 23.45% and 18.23% of the population respectively.

At the time of the 2011 census, 83.33% of the population spoke Kannada, 7.33% Urdu, 5.39% Telugu and 2.29% Lambadi as their first language.

Economy
In 2006 the Ministry of Panchayati Raj named Chitradurga one of the country's 250 most backward districts (out of a total of 640). It is one of the five districts in Karnataka currently receiving funds from the Backward Regions Grant Fund Programme (BRGF).

People

 Madakari Nayaka – King of Chitradurga
 Onake Obavva – Legendary woman who fought Hyder Ali's army.
 Malladihalli Sri Raghavendra Swamiji (Tiruka) – yogi and Ayurvedic guru
 S. Nijalingappa (vinayak) – politician, ex-CM, ex-MP and ex All India Congress lead
 T.R. Subba Rao (TaRaSu) – a novelist, 1985 winner of Sahitya Akademi Award for his novel Durgasthamana
 Tirumalai Krishnamacharya – yogi and Ayurvedic guru. One of the most influential yoga teachers of the 20th century and is credited with the revival of hatha yoga. Also called father of Modern Yoga.
 P. R. Thippeswamy (PRT) – Artist, Writer & Folklorist – K. Venkatappa Awardee 1999, ex-Chairman Karnataka Lalithakala Academy

See also
 Districts of Karnataka

References

External links

 Chitradurga district website
 Chitradurga City Municipal Council
 all about Chitradurga in kannada

 
Districts of Karnataka